Back Bay is a waterbody off the coast of Mumbai city, located to its (south) west and joins the Arabian Sea.

The shore of Back Bay includes the famed Chowpatty Beach of Mumbai. Other landmarks are the office district of Nariman Point, which is an extension of the Back Bay Reclamation; Marine Drive, which is a promenade road along much of the foreshore, that is colloquially called The Queen's Necklace, and has been renamed as the Netaji Subhashchandra Bose Road; the Oberoi Hotel; the Air India headquarters building; the Marine Plaza Hotel; the Taraporewala Aquarium; Wilson College, and the Malabar Hill promontory to the north-west of the bay, and which includes the wooded Governor's House or Raj Bhavan compound.

See also 
 Mahim Bay

References  

  
 https://m.timesofindia.com/city/mumbai/Entire-Backbay-area-in-Mumbai-may-be-opened-up-for-development/articleshow/39569820.cms
 https://www.theguardian.com/cities/2016/mar/30/story-cities-11-reclamation-mumbai-bombay-megacity-population-density-flood-risk
 https://www.asianage.com/metros/mumbai/310318/state-gives-backbay-plot-for-metro-station.html

Landforms of Mumbai
Bays of India